British Apples and Pears is the national trade body in the UK for the apple industry.

History
The organisation began in Kent in the early 1990s. 

In April and May 1997, severe frosts damaged orchards, giving the worst crop since 1934. Instead of 300,000 tonnes, output was expected at around 150,000 tonnes.

In 2010 it represented around 400 growers across country.

In 2014, the UK was the 39th largest producer of apples in the world. It produced 202,900 tonnes in 2012, down by half from 416,200 tonnes twenty five years before. Two-thirds of the nation's requirement for apples are imported; much of this is frozen for 12 months or more. The food industry is Britain's largest manufacturing industry, employing 1 in 8 people. In the 1970s and 1980s the EEC gave funding to British farmers for the removal of orchards. The lowest point of the British apple industry was 2003, with 143,900 tonnes produced.

Since 2010 British industry advertising could not claim any health benefits of apples, if not approved by the European Food Safety Authority (EFSA).

Structure
It was registered on 25 January 1990 as English Apples and Pears (EAP), its former name. The name changed on 9 October 2019.

It moved from Kent to Lincolnshire in December 2017.

See also
 Fernhurst Research Station in West Sussex, formerly of ICI Plant Protection Division
 List of countries by apple production
 List of countries by pear production
 World Apple and Pear Association

References

External links
 

1990 establishments in England
Apple production
East Lindsey District
Food industry trade groups based in the United Kingdom
Horticultural organisations based in the United Kingdom
Organisations based in Lincolnshire